The Cociovaliștea is a right tributary of the river Ialomița in Romania. It discharges into the Ialomița in Fierbinți-Târg. It flows through the villages Corbeanca, Săftica, Dumbrăveni, Balotești, Moara Vlăsiei, Grădiștea and Fierbinți-Târg.

References

Rivers of Romania
Rivers of Ilfov County
Rivers of Ialomița County
Rivers of Dâmbovița County